Paul Lamey (December 24, 1938 – December 15, 2020) was an American bobsledder. He competed at the 1968 Winter Olympics and the 1972 Winter Olympics.

References

External links
 

1938 births
2020 deaths
American male bobsledders
Olympic bobsledders of the United States
Bobsledders at the 1968 Winter Olympics
Bobsledders at the 1972 Winter Olympics
Sportspeople from Manchester, New Hampshire